Juana Fernández Morales de Ibarbourou, also known as Juana de América, (March 8, 1892 – July 15, 1979) was a Uruguayan poet and one of the most popular poets of Spanish America. Her poetry, the earliest of which is often highly erotic, is notable for her identification of her feelings with nature around her. She was nominated for the Nobel Prize in Literature four times.

Biography

She was born Juana Fernández Morales on March 8, 1892, in Melo, Cerro Largo, Uruguay. The date of Juana's birth is often given as March 8, 1895, but according to a local state civil registry signed by two witnesses, the year was actually 1892. Juana began studies at the José Pedro Varela school in 1899 and moved to a religious school the following year, and two public schools afterwards. In 1909, at 17 years old, she published a prose piece, "Derechos femeninos" (women's rights), beginning a lifelong career as a prominent feminist.

She married Captain Lucas Ibarbourou Trillo (1879-1942) in a civil ceremony June 28, 1913, and had one child named Julio César Ibarbourou Fernández (1914-1988). In 1918, Juana moved to Montevideo with her family. As was the custom, Juana and Lucas were remarried in a religious ceremony on June 28, 1921 in the Church of Our Lady of Perpetual Aid. Lucas Ibarbourou died January 13, 1942.  Their son Julio became a compulsive gambler and drug addict and Juana spent nearly all of her money, eventually having to sell her houses, property and jewelry, to pay his debts and the costs of his medical care.

Juana de Ibarbourou died July 15, 1979 in Montevideo, Uruguay.

Poetry and philosophy

Juana de Ibarbourou was a feminist, naturalist, and pantheist.

Feminism
Juana de Ibarbourou was an early Latin American feminist. Ibarbourou's feminism is evident in poems such as "La Higuera", in which she describes a fig tree as more beautiful than the straight and blooming trees around it, and "Como La Primavera", in which she asserts that authenticity is more attractive than any perfume. Also, in "La Cita", Ibarbourou extols her naked form devoid of traditional ornamentation, comparing her natural features to various material accessories and finding in favor of her unadorned body.

Common themes
Nature imagery and eroticism define a great body of Ibarbourou's poetry.

Death
Ibarbourou's depiction of death in her poetry was not consistent throughout her body of work. In "La Inquietud Fugaz", Ibarbourou portrayed a binary, final death consistent with Western tradition. In "Vida-Garfio" and "Carne Inmortal", however, Ibarbourou describes her dead body giving rise to plant life, allowing her to live on.

In "Rebelde", one of Ibarbourou's most richly constructed poems, Ibarbourou details a confrontation between herself and Charon, the ferryman of the River Styx. Surrounded by wailing souls on the boat passage to the underworld, Ibarbourou defiantly refuses to lament her fate, acting as cheerfully as a sparrow. Although Ibarbourou does not escape her fate, she wins a moral victory against the forces of death.

Like most poets, Ibarbourou nursed an intense fear of death. Though it is easy to surmise this from her poetry, she states so explicitly in the first line of "Carne Inmortal."

Example of her poetry

"RECONQUISTA" (Reconquest)

No sé de donde regresó el anhelo 
De volver a cantar como en el tiempo 
en que tenía entre mi puño el cielo 
Y con una perla azul el pensamiento.

De una enlutada nube, la centella, 
Súbito pez, hendió la noche cálida 
Y en mí se abrió de nuevo la crisálida 
Del verso alado y su bruñida estrella.

Ahora ya es el hino centelleante 
Que alza hasta Dios la ofrenda poderosa 
De su bruñida lanza de diamante.

Unidad de la luz sobre la rosa. 
Y otra vez la conquista alucinante 
De la eterna poesía victoriosa.

-Montevideo, 1960 
Mi pequeño regalo de Pascuas para Nimia Vicens Madrazo, 
en su espléndido San Juan de Puerto Rico. Afectuosamente. -Juana de Ibarbourou

Published works
 Lenguas de diamante (1919)
 Raiz salvaje (1920)
 La rosa de los vientos (1930)
 Oro y tormenta (1956), biblical themes reflect her preoccupation with suffering and death.
 Chico Carlo (1944) contains her memoirs.
 Obras Completas (3rd ed. 1968).

Awards and honors
 Medal of Public Instruction of Venezuela (1927)
 Consecrated "Juana de América" in the Salon of the Lost Steps of the Legislative Palace of Montevideo (1929)
 Gold Medal of Francisco Pizarro (Peru, 1935)
 Order of the Condor of the Andes (Bolivia, 1937)
 Order of the Sun (Peru, 1938)
 President of the PEN Club of Uruguay (1941)
 Order of the Southern Cross (Brazil, 1945) (Ordem do Cruzeiro do Sul)
 Cross of the Commander of the Grand Humanitarian Prize of Belgium (1946)
 National Academy of Letters (Uruguay, 1947)
 Gold Medal from the Ministry of Public Instruction (Uruguay, 1948)
 Carlos Manuel Céspedes Order (Cuba, 1951)
 Named "Woman of the Americas" by the American Women's Union of New York (1953)
 Eloy Alfaro Order (Ecuador, 1953)
 National Grand Prize for Literature (Uruguay, 1959)
 Order of the Quetzal (Guatemala, 1960)
 Plaza in La Paz, Bolivia named for Juana de Ibarbourou (1965)
 Branch of the Juana de Ibarbourou Library and House of Culture opened in home town of Melo (1977)
 La Fiesta de los Milagros (1943)

Museums
In Melo, capital city of Cerro Largo Department, there are two museums that display her life:
 Juana de Ibarbourou's birthplace
 Regional History Museum

Notes and references

Works cited
 Sylvia Puentes de Oyenard. "Apuntes para una Biobibliografia de Juana de Ibarbourou." Foreword. Obras Escogidas. By Juana de Ibarbourou, ed. Sylvia Puentes de Oyenard. México, D.F.: Editorial Andres Bello, 1998.

External links

 Juana de Ibarbourou Papers, 1915–1960 (5 linear ft.) are housed in the Department of Special Collections and University Archives at Stanford University Libraries

1892 births
1979 deaths
Burials at Cementerio del Buceo, Montevideo
People from Cerro Largo Department
Pantheists
Uruguayan feminists
20th-century Uruguayan poets
Uruguayan people of Galician descent
Uruguayan people of Spanish descent
Feminist writers
Recipients of the Order of the Sun of Peru
Order of the Quetzal
Postmodern writers
Postmodern feminists
Members of the Uruguayan Academy of Language
20th-century Uruguayan women writers
Uruguayan women poets